Cuckoos are birds in the Cuculidae  family, the sole taxon in the order Cuculiformes . The cuckoo family includes the common or European cuckoo, roadrunners, koels, malkohas, couas, coucals and anis. The coucals and anis are sometimes separated as distinct families, the Centropodidae and Crotophagidae respectively. The cuckoo order Cuculiformes is one of three that make up the Otidimorphae, the other two being the turacos and the bustards. The family Cuculidae contains 150 species which are divided into 33 genera.

The cuckoos are generally medium-sized slender birds. Most species live in trees, though a sizeable minority are ground-dwelling. The family has a cosmopolitan distribution; the majority of species are tropical. Some species are migratory. The cuckoos feed on insects, insect larvae and a variety of other animals, as well as fruit. Some species are brood parasites, laying their eggs in the nests of other species and giving rise to the metaphor cuckoo's egg, but the majority of species raise their own young.

Cuckoos have played a role in human culture for thousands of years, appearing in Greek mythology as sacred to the goddess Hera. In Europe, the cuckoo is associated with spring, and with cuckoldry, for example in Shakespeare's Love's Labour's Lost. In India, cuckoos are sacred to Kamadeva, the god of desire and longing, whereas in Japan, the cuckoo symbolises unrequited love.

Description 

There is generally little sexual dimorphism in size, but where it exists, it can be either the male or the female that is larger. One of the most important distinguishing features of the family are the feet, which are zygodactyl, meaning that the two inner toes point forward and the two outer backward. There are two basic body forms, arboreal species (like the common cuckoo) which are slender and have short tarsi, and terrestrial species (like the roadrunners) which are more heavy set and have long tarsi. Almost all species have long tails which are used for steering in terrestrial species and as a rudder during flight in the arboreal species. The wing shape also varies with lifestyle, with the more migratory species like the black-billed cuckoo possessing long narrow wings capable of strong direct flight, and the more terrestrial and sedentary cuckoos like the coucals and malkohas having shorter rounded wings and a more laboured gliding flight.

The subfamily Cuculinae are the brood-parasitic cuckoos of the Old World. They tend to conform to the classic shape, with (usually) long tails, short legs, long narrow wings and an arboreal lifestyle. The largest species, the channel-billed cuckoo, also has the most outsized bill in the family, resembling that of a hornbill. The subfamily Phaenicophaeinae are the non-parasitic cuckoos of the Old World, and include the couas, malkohas, and ground-cuckoos. They are more terrestrial cuckoos, with strong and often long legs and short rounded wings. The subfamily typically has brighter plumage and brightly coloured bare skin around the eye. The coucals are another terrestrial Old World subfamily of long tailed long legged and short winged cuckoos. They are large heavyset birds with the largest, the greater black coucal, being around the same size as the channel-billed cuckoo. The subfamily Coccyzinae are arboreal and long tailed as well, with a number of large insular forms. The New World ground cuckoos are similar to the Asian ground-cuckoos in being long legged and terrestrial, and includes the long billed roadrunner, which can reach speeds of 30 km/h when chasing prey. The final subfamily are the atypical anis, which include the small clumsy anis and the larger guira cuckoo. The anis have massive bills and smooth glossy feathers.

The feathers of the cuckoos are generally soft, and often become waterlogged in heavy rain. Cuckoos often sun themselves after rain, and the anis hold their wings open in the manner of a vulture or cormorant while drying. There is considerable variation in the plumage exhibited by the family. Some species, particularly the brood parasites have cryptic plumage, whereas others have bright and elaborate plumage. This is particularly true of the Chrysococcyx or glossy cuckoos, which have iridescent plumage. Some cuckoos have a resemblance to hawks in the genus Accipiter with barring on the underside; this apparently alarms potential hosts, allowing the female to access a host nest. The young of some brood parasites are coloured so as to resemble the young of the host. For example, the Asian koels breeding in India have black offspring to resemble their crow hosts, whereas in the Australian koels the chicks are brown like the honeyeater hosts. Sexual dimorphism in plumage is uncommon in the cuckoos, being most common in the parasitic Old World species. Cuckoos have 10  and 9–13 .

Distribution and habitat 

The cuckoos have a cosmopolitan distribution, ranging across all the world's continents except Antarctica. They are absent from the south west of South America, the far north and north west of North America, and the driest areas of the Middle East and North Africa (although they occur there as passage migrants). They generally only occur as vagrants in the oceanic islands of the Atlantic and Indian Oceans, but one species breeds on a number of Pacific islands and another is a winter migrant across much of the Pacific.

Cuculinae is the most widespread subfamily of cuckoos, and is distributed across Europe, Asia, Africa, Australia and Oceania. Amongst the Phaenicophaeinae cuckoos the malkohas and Asian ground-cuckoos are restricted to southern Asia, the couas are endemic to Madagascar and the yellowbill widespread across Africa. The coucals are distributed from Africa through tropical Asia down into Australia and the Solomon Islands. The remaining three subfamilies have a New World distribution, all three are found in both North and South America. The Coccyzinae reaches the furthest north of the three subfamilies, breeding in Canada, whereas the anis reach as far north as Florida and the typical ground-cuckoos the south west United States.

For the cuckoos suitable habitat provides a source of food (principally insects and especially caterpillars) and a place to breed, for brood parasites the need is for suitable habitat for the host species. Cuckoos occur in a wide variety of habitats. The majority of species occur in forests and woodland, principally in the evergreen rainforests of the tropics. Some species inhabit or are even restricted to mangrove forests; these include the little bronze cuckoo of Australia, some malkohas, coucals, and the aptly-named mangrove cuckoo of the New World. In addition to forests some species of cuckoo occupy more open environments; this can include even arid areas like deserts in the case of the greater roadrunner or the pallid cuckoo. Temperate migratory species like the common cuckoo inhabit a wide range of habitats in order to make maximum use of the potential brood hosts, from reed beds (where they parasitise reed warblers) to treeless moors (where they parasitise meadow pipits).

Migration 

Most species of cuckoo are sedentary, but some undertake regular seasonal migrations and others undertake partial migrations over part of their range.

Species breeding at higher latitudes migrate to warmer climates during the winter due to food availability. The long-tailed koel, which breeds in New Zealand, flies to its wintering grounds in Polynesia, Micronesia, and Melanesia, a feat described as "perhaps the most remarkable overwater migration of any land bird." The yellow-billed cuckoo and black-billed cuckoo breed in North America and fly across the Caribbean Sea, a non-stop flight of 4000 km. Other long migration flights include the lesser cuckoo, which flies from Africa to India, and the common cuckoo of Europe, which flies non-stop over the Mediterranean Sea and Sahara Desert on the voyage between Europe and central Africa.

Within Africa, ten species make regular intra-continental migrations that are described as polarised; that is, they spend the non-breeding season in the tropical centre of the continent and move north and south to breed in the more arid and open savannah and deserts. This is the same as the situation in the Neotropics, where no species have this migration pattern, or tropical Asia, where a single species does. 83% of the Australian species are partial migrants within Australia or travel to New Guinea and Indonesia after the breeding season.

In some species the migration is diurnal, as in the channel-billed cuckoo, or nocturnal, as in the yellow-billed cuckoo.

Behaviour and ecology 

The cuckoos are for the most part solitary birds that seldom occur in pairs or groups. The biggest exception to this are the anis of the Americas, which have evolved cooperative breeding and other social behaviours. For the most part the cuckoos are also diurnal as opposed to nocturnal, but many species call at night (see below). The cuckoos are also generally a shy and retiring family, more often heard than seen. The exception to this are again the anis, which are often extremely trusting towards humans and other species.

Most cuckoos are insectivorous, and in particular are specialised in eating larger insects and caterpillars, including noxious hairy types avoided by other birds. They are unusual among birds in processing their prey prior to swallowing, rubbing it back and forth on hard objects such as branches and then crushing it with special bony plates in the back of the mouth. They also take a wide range of other insects and animal prey. The lizard cuckoos of the Caribbean have, in the relative absence of birds of prey, specialised in taking lizards. Larger, ground types such as coucals and roadrunners also feed variously on snakes, lizards, small rodents, and other birds, which they bludgeon with their strong bills. Ground species may employ different techniques to catch prey. A study of two coua species in Madagascar found that the Coquerel's coua obtained prey by walking and gleaning on the forest floor, whereas the red-capped coua ran and pounced on prey. Both species also showed seasonal flexibility in prey and foraging techniques. 

The parasitic cuckoos are generally not recorded as participating in mixed-species feeding flocks, although some studies in eastern Australia found several species participated in the non-breeding season, but were mobbed and unable to do so in the breeding season. Ground-cuckoos of the genus Neomorphus are sometimes seen feeding in association with army ant swarms, although they are not obligate ant-followers as are some antbirds. The anis are ground feeders that follow cattle and other large mammals when foraging; in a similar fashion to cattle egrets they snatch prey flushed by the cattle and enjoy higher foraging success rates in this way.

Several koels, couas, and the channel-billed cuckoo feed mainly on fruit, but they are not exclusively frugivores. The parasitic koels and channel-billed cuckoo in particular consume mainly fruit when raised by frugivore hosts such as the Australasian figbird and pied currawong. Other species occasionally take fruit as well. Couas consume fruit in the dry season when prey is harder to find.

Breeding 
The cuckoos are an extremely diverse group of birds with regards to breeding systems. The majority of species are monogamous, but there are exceptions. The anis and the guira cuckoo lay their eggs in communal nests, which is built by all members of the group. Incubation, brooding and territorial defence duties are shared by all members of the group. Within these species the anis breed as groups of monogamous pairs, but the guira cuckoos are not monogamous within the group, exhibiting a polygynandrous breeding system. This group nesting behaviour is not completely cooperative; females compete and may remove others' eggs when laying hers. Eggs are usually only ejected early in the breeding season in the anis, but can be ejected at any time by guria cuckoos. Polyandry has been confirmed in the African black coucal and is suspected to occur in the other coucals, perhaps explaining the reversed sexual dimorphism in the group.

The majority of cuckoo species, including malkohas, couas, coucals, and roadrunners and most other American cuckoos, build their own nests, although a large minority engage in brood parasitism (see below). Most of these species nest in trees or bushes, but the coucals lay their eggs in nests on the ground or in low shrubs. Though on some occasions non-parasitic cuckoos parasitize other species, the parent still helps feed the chick.

The nests of cuckoos vary in the same way as the breeding systems. The nests of malkohas and Asian ground cuckoos are shallow platforms of twigs, but those of coucals are globular or domed nests of grasses. The New World cuckoos build saucers or bowls in the case of the New World ground cuckoos.

Non-parasitic cuckoos, like most other non-passerines, lay white eggs, but many of the parasitic species lay coloured eggs to match those of their passerine hosts.

The young of all species are altricial. Non-parasitic cuckoos leave the nest before they can fly, and some New World species have the shortest incubation periods among birds.

Brood parasitism 

About 56 of the Old World species and 3 of the New World species (pheasant, pavonine, and striped) are brood parasites, laying their eggs in the nests of other birds and giving rise to the metaphor cuckoo's egg. These species are obligate brood parasites, meaning that they only reproduce in this fashion. The best-known example is the European common cuckoo. In addition to the above noted species, others sometimes engage in non-obligate brood parasitism, laying their eggs in the nests of members of their own species in addition to raising their own young. Brood parasitism has even been seen in Greater roadrunners where its eggs were seen in the nests of Common ravens and Northern mockingbirds.  The shells of the eggs of brood-parasitic cuckoos are usually thicker and stronger than those of their hosts. This protects the egg if a host parent tries to damage it, and may make it resistant to cracking when dropped into a host nest. Cuckoo eggshells have two distinct layers. In some nesting cuckoos, there is a thick outer chalky layer that is not present on the eggs of most brood-parasitic species, although there are some exceptions and the eggshells of Old World parasitic cuckoos have a thick outer layer that is different from that of nesting cuckoos.

The cuckoo egg hatches earlier than the host eggs, and the cuckoo chick grows faster; in most cases the chick evicts the eggs and/or young of the host species. The chick has no time to learn this behavior, nor does any parent stay around to teach it, so it must be an instinct passed on genetically.

One reason for the cuckoo egg's hatching sooner is that, after the egg is fully formed, the female cuckoo holds it in her oviduct for another 24 hours prior to laying. This means that the egg has already had 24 hours of internal incubation. Furthermore, the cuckoo's internal temperature is 3-4 degrees Celsius higher than the temperature at which the egg is incubated in the nest, and the higher temperature means that the egg incubates faster, so at the time it is laid the egg has already had the equivalent of 30 hours incubation in a nest.

The chick encourages the host to keep pace with its high growth rate with its rapid begging call and the chick's open mouth which serves as a sign stimulus.

Since obligate brood parasites need to successfully trick their host in order for them to reproduce, they have evolved adaptations at several stages of breeding. However, there are high costs of parasitism on the host, leading to strong selections on the host to recognize and reject parasitic eggs. The adaptations and counter-adaptations between hosts and parasites have led to a coevolution arms race. This means that if one of the species involved were to stop adapting, it would lose the race to the other species, resulting in decreased fitness of the losing species. The egg-stage adaptation is the best studied stage of this arms race.

Cuckoos have various strategies for getting their eggs into host nests. Different species use different strategies based on host defensive strategies. Female cuckoos have secretive and fast laying behaviors, but in some cases, males have been shown to lure host adults away from their nests so that the female can lay her egg in the nest. Some host species may directly try to prevent cuckoos laying eggs in their nest in the first place – birds whose nests are at high risk of cuckoo-contamination are known to 'mob' cuckoos to drive them out of the area. Parasitic cuckoos are grouped into gentes, with each gens specializing in a particular host. There is some evidence that the gentes are genetically different from one another.

Female parasitic cuckoos sometimes specialize and lay eggs that closely resemble the eggs of their chosen host. Some birds are able to distinguish cuckoo eggs from their own, leading to those eggs least like the host's being thrown out of the nest. Parasitic cuckoos that show the highest levels of egg mimicry are those whose hosts exhibit high levels of egg rejection behavior. Some hosts do not exhibit egg rejection behavior and the cuckoo eggs look very dissimilar from the host eggs. It has also been shown in a study of the European common cuckoos that females will lay their egg in the nest of a host that has eggs that look similar to its own. Other species of cuckoo lay "cryptic" eggs, which are dark in color when their hosts' eggs are light. This is a trick to hide the egg from the host, and is exhibited in cuckoos that parasitize hosts with dark, domed nests. Some adult parasitic cuckoos completely destroy the host's clutch if they reject the cuckoo egg. In this case, raising the cuckoo chick is less of a cost than the alternative, total clutch destruction.

There are two main hypotheses on the cognitive mechanisms that mediate host distinguishing of eggs. One hypothesis is true recognition, which states that a host compares eggs present in its clutch to an internal template (learnt or innate), to identify if parasitic eggs are present. However, memorizing a template of a parasitic egg is costly and imperfect and likely not identical to each host's egg. The other one is the discordancy hypothesis, which states that a host compares eggs in the clutch and identifies the odd ones. However, if parasitic eggs made the majority of eggs in the clutch, then hosts will end up rejecting their own eggs. More recent studies have found that it is more likely that both mechanisms contribute to host discrimination of parasitic eggs since one compensates for the limitations of the other.

The parasitism is not necessarily entirely detrimental to the host species. A 16-year dataset was used in 2014 to find that carrion crow nests in a region of Northern Spain were more successful overall (more likely to produce at least one crow fledgling) when parasitised by the great spotted cuckoo. The researchers attributed this to a strong-smelling predator-repelling substance secreted by cuckoo chicks when attacked, and noted that the interactions were not necessarily simply parasitic or mutualistic. This relationship was not observed for any other host species, or for any other species of cuckoo. Great spotted cuckoo chicks do not evict host eggs or young, and are smaller and weaker than carrion crow chicks, so both of these factors may have contributed to the effect observed.

However, subsequent research using a dataset from southern Spain  failed to replicate these findings, and the second research team also criticised the methodology used in experiments described in the first paper. The authors of the first study have responded to points made in the second  and both groups agree that further research is needed before the mutualistic effect can be considered proven.

Calls 
Cuckoos are often highly secretive and in many cases best known for their wide repertoire of calls. These are usually relatively simple, resembling whistles, flutes, or hiccups. The calls are used in order to demonstrate ownership of a territory and to attract a mate. Within a species the calls are remarkably consistent across the range, even in species with very large ranges. This suggests, along with the fact that many species are not raised by their true parents, that the calls of cuckoos are innate and not learnt. Although cuckoos are diurnal, many species call at night.

The cuckoo family gets its English and scientific names from the call of the male common cuckoo, which is also familiar from cuckoo clocks. Some of the names of other species and genera are also derived from their calls, for example the koels of Asia and Australasia. In most cuckoos the calls are distinctive to particular species, and are useful for identification. Several cryptic species are best identified on the basis of their calls.

Phylogeny and evolution
The family Cuculidae was introduced by the English zoologist William Elford Leach in a guide to the contents of the British Museum published in 1820.

There is very little fossil record of cuckoos and their evolutionary history remains unclear. Dynamopterus was an Oligocene genus of large cuckoo, though it may have been related to cariamas instead.

A 2014 genome analysis by Erich Jarvis and collaborators found a clade of birds that contains the orders Cuculiformes (cuckoos), Musophagiformes (turacos), and Otidiformes (bustards). This has been named the Otidimorphae. Relationships between the orders is unclear.

The following cladogram shows the phylogenetic relationships between the genera. It is from a 2005 study by Michael Sorenson and Robert Payne and is based solely on an analysis of mitochondrial DNA sequences. The number of species in each genus is taken from the list maintained by Frank Gill, Pamela Rasmussen and David Donsker on behalf of the International Ornithological Committee (IOC).

Taxonomy and systematics 

For the living members of each genus, see the article List of cuckoo species.

The family Cuculidae contains 150 species which are divided into 33 genera. These numbers include two species that have become extinct in historical times: the snail-eating coua from Madagascar and the Saint Helena cuckoo which is placed in its own genus Nannococcyx.

 Subfamily Crotophaginae – New World group-living cuckoos
 Genus Guira – guira cuckoo
 Genus Crotophaga – true anis (3 species)
 Subfamily Neomorphinae – New World ground cuckoos
 Genus Tapera – striped cuckoo
 Genus Dromococcyx (2 species)
 Genus Morococcyx – lesser ground cuckoo
 Genus Geococcyx – roadrunners (2 species)
 Genus Neomorphus – Neotropical ground-cuckoos (5 species)
 Subfamily Centropodinae – coucals
 Genus Centropus  – (29 species)
 Subfamily Couinae – Madagasy and South East Asian ground cuckoos
 Genus Carpococcyx – Asian ground-cuckoos (3 species)
 Genus Coua – couas (9 living species, 1 recently extinct)
 Subfamily Cuculinae
 Genus Rhinortha – Raffles's malkoha
 Tribe Phaenicophaeini
 Genus Ceuthmochares – yellowbills (2 species)
 Genus Taccocua – Sirkeer malkoha
 Genus Zanclostomus – red-billed malkoha
 Genus Phaenicophaeus – typical malkohas (6 species)
 Genus Dasylophus – (2 species)
 Genus Rhamphococcyx – yellow-billed malkoha
 Genus Clamator  – (4 species)
 Genus Coccycua – formerly in Coccyzus and Piaya, includes Micrococcyx (3 species)
 Genus Piaya  – (2 species)
 Genus Coccyzus – includes Saurothera and Hyetornis (13 species)
 Tribe Cuculini – brood-parasitic cuckoos of the Old World
 Genus Pachycoccyx – thick-billed cuckoo
 Genus Microdynamis – dwarf koel
 Genus Eudynamys – typical koels (3 species)
 Genus Scythrops – channel-billed cuckoo
 Genus Urodynamis – Pacific long-tailed cuckoo
 Genus Chrysococcyx – bronze cuckoos (13 species)
 Genus Cacomantis  – (10 species)
 Genus Surniculus – drongo-cuckoos (4 species)
 Genus Cercococcyx – long-tailed cuckoos (4 species)
 Genus Hierococcyx – hawk-cuckoos (8 species)
 Genus Cuculus – typical cuckoos (11 species)
 † Genus Nannococcyx – Saint Helena cuckoo (extinct)
 Fossils
 Genus Dynamopterus (fossil: Late Eocene/Early Oligocene of Caylus, Tarn-et-Garonne, France)
 Genus Cursoricoccyx (fossil: Early Miocene of Logan County, USA) – Neomorphinae?
 Cuculidae gen. et sp. indet. (fossil: Early Pliocene of Lee Creek Mine, USA)
 Genus Neococcyx (fossil: Early Oligocene of Central North America)
 Genus Eocuculus (fossil: Late Eocene of Teller County, USA)

In human culture 

In Greek mythology the god Zeus transformed himself into a cuckoo so that he could seduce the goddess Hera, to whom the bird was sacred. In England, William Shakespeare alludes to the common cuckoo's association with spring, and with cuckoldry, in the courtly springtime song in his play Love's Labours Lost. In India, cuckoos are sacred to Kamadeva, the god of desire and longing, whereas in Japan, the cuckoo symbolises unrequited love. Cuckoos are a sacred animal to the Bon religion of Tibet.

The orchestral composition "On Hearing the First Cuckoo in Spring" by Frederick Delius imitates sounds of the cuckoo.

The greater roadrunner, a cuckoo, is the state bird of the US state of New Mexico and is a common symbol of the American Southwest in general. "Wile E. Coyote and the Road Runner" was a long running series of cartoons by Warner Brothers Studios that has had enduring popularity from the time the characters were created in 1949 through the present and helps define the image of the roadrunner in popular culture.

Since 1962, Sonny the Cuckoo Bird has been the mascot for Cocoa Puffs, a product of General Mills that was launched six years before the character was created.

In The Legend of Zelda series of games created by Nintendo, there is a fictional species of bird known as the Cucco that was likely named after the Cuckoo, first appearing in 1992 with The Legend of Zelda: A Link to the Past. However, the species is more similar to a Chicken than a real Cuckoo.

The metaphor of the cuckoo's egg is referenced in the title of the anime and manga series A Couple of Cuckoos, where a pair of infants are switched at birth and raised by the other's family.

References

Sources

External links 

 Cuckoo sounds on xeno-canto.org
 Cuckoo videos on the Internet Bird Collection

 
Articles containing video clips
Priabonian first appearances
Extant Eocene first appearances
Taxa named by William Elford Leach